Ola Johan Gjengedal (14 February 1900 – 15 May 1992) was a Norwegian politician for the Christian Democratic Party.

He was born in Gloppen.

He was elected to the Norwegian Parliament from Møre og Romsdal in 1965, and was re-elected on three occasions. He had previously served in the position of deputy representative during five terms from 1945 to 1965.

Gjengedal was involved in local politics in Ørsta municipality before and after World War II.

References

1900 births
1992 deaths
Members of the Storting
Møre og Romsdal politicians
Christian Democratic Party (Norway) politicians
Place of death missing
20th-century Norwegian politicians
People from Gloppen